William Edward Leuchtenburg (born September 28, 1922) is an American historian. He is the William Rand Kenan Jr. Professor Emeritus of History at the University of North Carolina at Chapel Hill, and a leading scholar of the life and career of Franklin Delano Roosevelt.

Career
Leuchtenburg was born in New York City on September 28, 1922. On Ken Burns' documentary series Prohibition, he described, when he was a child, how his father was reported for operating an illegal distillery during the Prohibition Era. He received his BA degree in 1943 from Cornell University, where he was inducted into the Phi Beta Kappa Society.  He later received his PhD from Columbia University in 1951.

He won the 2007 North Carolina Award for Literature.

He served as a program consultant for Ken Burns' documentary series Prohibition, which premiered on PBS in October, 2011.

He is a past president of the American Historical Association, the Organization of American Historians, and the Society of American Historians. Eric Foner is the only other historian to claim that distinction.

Leuchtenburg turned 100 on September 28, 2022.

Bibliography
Leuchtenburg is the author of more than a dozen books on 20th-century history, including the Bancroft Prize–winning Franklin D. Roosevelt and the New Deal, 1932–1940 (1963), a volume in the New American Nation series co-edited by his mentor Henry Steele Commager and Richard B. Morris.  His works include:

 "Progressivism and Imperialism: The Progressive Movement and American Foreign Policy, 1898-1916." Mississippi Valley Historical Review 39.3 (1952): 483-504. online
 "Roosevelt, Norris and the" Seven Little TVAs"." Journal of Politics 14.3 (1952): 418-441.
Flood Control Politics: The Connecticut River Valley Problem, 1927–1950 (1953)
The Perils of Prosperity, 1914–32 (1958)  online
The New Freedom: A Call for the Emancipation of the Generous Energies of a People (Introduction) (1961)
The LIFE History of the United States, Volume 11: 1933–1945 – New Deal and Global War (1963)
The LIFE History of the United States, Volume 12: From 1945 – The Great Age of Change (1963)
Franklin D. Roosevelt and the New Deal, 1932–1940 (1963) online
 "The Origins of Franklin D. Roosevelt's" Court-Packing" Plan." The Supreme Court Review 1966 (1966): 347-400.
The New Deal: A Documentary History (1968)
Growth of the American Republic (2 vols.) with Samuel Eliot Morison and Henry Steele Commager (1969)
A Troubled Feast: American Society Since 1945 (1973)
 "A Klansman Joins the Court: The Appointment of Hugo L. Black." The University of Chicago Law Review 41 (1973): 1+.
New Deal and Global War (1974)
The Growth of the American Republic (Volume I) with Samuel Eliot Morison and Henry Steele Commager (1980)
A Concise History of the American Republic (Single Volume) with Samuel Eliot Morison and Henry Steele Commager (1983)
In the Shadow of FDR: From Harry Truman to Ronald Reagan (1989; fourth edition, subtitled From Harry Truman to Barack Obama, 2009) online
The Perils of Prosperity, 1914–1932 (The Chicago History of American Civilization) (1993)
The Supreme Court Reborn: The Constitutional Revolution in the Age of Roosevelt (1996)
The FDR Years: On Roosevelt and His Legacy (1997)
American Places: Encounters with History (editor) (2000)
That Man: An Insider's Portrait of Franklin D. Roosevelt with Robert H. Jackson et al. (2004)
The White House Looks South: Franklin D. Roosevelt, Harry S. Truman, Lyndon B. Johnson (2005)
The Executive Branch (2006)
Herbert Hoover (The American Presidents Series) (2006)
The American President: From Teddy Roosevelt to Bill Clinton (2015)

References

External links

Interview in Smithsonian magazine
Interviewed on Humankind public radio show
Testified to Senate Committee Judiciary against the Bork nomination, 23 September 1987

1922 births
Living people
21st-century American historians
21st-century American male writers
American centenarians
Men centenarians
American political scientists
American political writers
American male non-fiction writers
Columbia University alumni
Cornell University alumni
Presidents of the American Historical Association
University of North Carolina at Chapel Hill faculty
Harold Vyvyan Harmsworth Professors of American History
Bancroft Prize winners